Benito Espinós (1748, Valencia - March 23, 1818, Valencia) was a Spanish painter who specialized in floral still-lifes and ornamentation.

Biography 
His father, José Espinós (1721-1784), was a painter and engraver who had trained with the Baroque master, Evaristo Muñoz. In 1784, he was named Director of the School of Flowers and Ornamentation at the Real Academia de Bellas Artes de San Carlos, whose primary function was providing design for the silk industry. Through the mediation of the  Conde de Floridablanca, he also received commissions from the Royal Court. In 1788 he travelled to Madrid, with the object of presenting five of his paintings to the soon-to-be King Carlos IV

In 1815, after suffering a stroke that caused him to lose his sight in one eye, he resigned from his position at the Academia.

In his output, one may distinguish two clear phases; the first which featured elaborate garlands, backed by architectural scenes or figures, and the second, consisting largely of natural floral arrangements with vases and other simple props. All of his work maintains a strict Classical style. Many of his works may be seen at the Reial Acadèmia Catalana de Belles Arts de Sant Jordi.

References

External links

 More works by Espinós @ ArtNet
 Biography @ the Museo del Prado

1748 births
1818 deaths
People from Valencia
18th-century Spanish painters
18th-century Spanish male artists
Spanish male painters
19th-century Spanish painters
Spanish floral still life painters
19th-century Spanish male artists